Serge Jean Maury (born 24 July 1946) is a French sailor. He competed in the finn class at the 1972 and 1976 Olympics and won a gold medal in 1972. He won the Finn Gold Cup in 1973 and placed third in 1971.

References

External links
 
 
 
 

1946 births
Living people
French male sailors (sport)
Sailors at the 1972 Summer Olympics – Finn
Sailors at the 1976 Summer Olympics – Finn
Olympic sailors of France
Olympic gold medalists for France
Olympic medalists in sailing
Medalists at the 1972 Summer Olympics
Finn class world champions
World champions in sailing for France